The Expulsion of Chileans from Bolivia and Peru in 1879 was an ethnic cleansing ordered by of the governments of Bolivia (on 1 March 1879) and Peru (on 15 April 1879). The expulsion took place at the beginning of the War of the Pacific (1879-1883) between Chile and Peruvian-Bolivian alliance. Chilean citizens (about 30,000 to 40,000 in number) in both nations were ordered to leave within eight days or face internment and confiscation of their property. They were expelled on poorly-built rafts and pontoons at Peruvian ports, or forced to wander through the desert to reach the northernmost positions occupied by the Chilean Army in Antofagasta. The edict was widely popular in Peru and met with little resistance, allowing it to occur quickly.

Chilean workers in Peru and Bolivia 

In Peru and Bolivia, migrant Chilean workers were employed in industries that the local inhabitants were unable or unwilling to perform in such as railroad construction, the nitrate industry, and the docks. Chile also had investments in both countries.

Chileans were often key organizers of labour but also "nationalist" quarrels and riots.

Regarding how the Chilean workers were viewed in the new countries, Chilean historian Juan Pinto Vallejos asserts that, "they were, to a certain extent, accustomed to an industrial work discipline and that their permanent rebellion against authorities and bosses were only a visible refusal to the capitalist driven disintegration of the traditional Chilean society. Among Chilean migrants, there was a kind of connection...because of their condition as foreigners in Peru and Bolivia, despite the only common ground being that they were all from Chile."

Vallejos also stated that, "due to their growing population, their violent conduct, and their exacerbated national identity, Chilean migrants became an unsolved issue for the maintenance of peace, public order and security in Tarapaca as well as Antofagasta." This resulted in the widespread government surveillance of Chileans in both Bolivia and Peru.

Benjamín Vicuña Mackenna wrote about a Chilean organization known as La Patria whose sole objective was to separate the Antofagasta region from Bolivia.

Peru

Chilean workers were present in Peru throughout the second half of the 19th century, especially in the Tarapacá Province and Central Peru. It is not known how many Chileans were living in Peru in 1879 but according to the 1876 Peruvian census, Chileans made up around 26% of the population in Tarapacá. In Iquique, the main port of the region, 52% of the population was Chilean. Between 1868 and 1872 there were 20,000 to 25,000 Chileans who came to work on construction of the railroads, recruited by Henry Meiggs.

In December 1876, Chile and Peru negotiated a treaty of friendship, commerce and navigation, but it was not ratified by either nation. Among other things, it would have protected the rights of migrants in both countries.

Bolivia
In Bolivian Antofagasta, the 1878 census showed that 77% of the inhabitants were Chilean.

Chilean companies also exploited the mineral resources in Huanchaca (silver mine), Corocoro (cooper mine), Oruro (silver mine), and the prosperous silver town of Caracoles. In all, there were 49 companies registered in Santiago or Valparaiso, with a nominal capital of 16,000,000 Chilean pesos. The main producer of nitrate in Antofagasta was the Chilean Compañía de Salitres y Ferrocarriles de Antofagasta (CSFA), which had Antony Gibbs & Sons of London as one of its minority shareholders. The CSFA had a nominal capital of 2,000,000 Chilean pesos.

Background 

In 1878, the Bolivian Government imposed a new tax on nitrate exports, affecting the CSFA, in contradiction of Article IV of the Boundary Treaty of 1874 between Chile and Bolivia which prohibited any new tax on Chilean businesses and investments in Antofagasta. The company refused to pay the tax, and in February 1879 the Bolivian Government cancelled their mining licenses, nationalized the CSFA and announced its auction. Peru, allied with Bolivia due to a secret treaty of alliance signed in 1873, had tried to build a saltpeter monopoly and was set to benefit greatly from the breakup of the CSFA, its main competitor.

On 14 February 1879, the port of Antofagasta, and later the whole province, was seized by Chilean troops. On 1 March 1879, Bolivia declared war with Chile. On 5 April 1879, Chile declared war on Peru, leading to Bolivia and Peru declared a casus foederis the following day.

Eviction decrees 

On 1 March 1879, Hilarion Daza, dictator of Bolivia, announced that Bolivia was in a state of war and ordered the cessation of all commerce with Chile, as well as  the eviction of all Chilean citizens from Bolivian territory within 8 days; they were permitted to take only hand luggage and their personal papers. The rest of their property was seized by the state. Chilean-owned businesses continued to function under state supervision, but the profits were confiscated. This applied to all Chilean-owned businesses (despite whether the owners lived in Bolivia). Moreover, any transfer of Chilean property after 8 November 1878 was nullified.

In Peru, the eviction was decreed on 15 April 1879 by the Government of Mariano Ignacio Prado "to secure the success of the military operations"; within 8 days all Chileans had to leave Peru, except Chilean owners of real estate and those who had a Peruvian wife. Disobeying the decree would result in the internment of the wrongdoer(s). Two days later, the property and marital exceptions were suspended "in reprisal for the Chilean bombardment of defenseless Peruvian ports", and all Chilean citizens had to leave Peru within 8 days.

On 17 April 1879, the Peruvian newspaper "El Peruano" justified the measure, which was considered tough but necessary, for counterespionage reasons as well as retaliation against the insolent and provocative attitude of Chileans in Peru, the aggression against Peruvians citizens in Chile, and the Chilean bombardment of defenseless ports. It alluded to the expulsion of German citizens from France during the Franco-Prussian War which conformed to international law, according to Bluntschli.

Direct consequences 

In Peru, a humanitarian crisis unfolded, as thousands of men, women and children tried to reach the coast and get a ticket in one of the ships bound for Chile in order to return home. Those who could not leave the country were imprisoned, and in some cases condemned to forced labor.

Chilean historian Diego Barros Arana wrote:

Sergio Villalobos asserts that the first group that was expelled from Huanillos was made up of 400 Chileans and the journey took three days. Other groups came from Huanillos to Tocopilla and Iquique. They were concentrated in the customs zone of the port, and the Peruvian authorities used them as a human shield against the Chilean shelling of the port. On 5 April 1879, hundreds of refugees from Lima embarked on the Rimac and began to threaten General Juan Buendia, Chief of the Peruvian Army of Iquique. The captain of the ship, without the means to confront the refugees, had to disembark in the closest port.

In Pabellon de Pica, one of the guano extraction fields in Tarapaca, a Chilean Navy raid against the port on 15 April 1879 found 350 refugees on a pontoon, property of a British citizen who had allowed them to stay there because they were unable to walk to Tocopilla. The next day, the raid was continued in Huanillos, where they found 100 Chileans enclosed in a pontoon. In both places, the guano loading equipment was destroyed and the refugees brought to Iquique (under blockade) to board ships heading for Antofagasta.

Carlos Donoso Rojas asserts that the head of Chilean Consulate in Iquique, Antonio Solari Millas, had to face the difficult task of moving thousand of Chilean citizens to ships after the Peruvian Government issued a decree that punished with fines those who protected or hid Chilean refugees on 29 May 1879. Even before their arrival in Antofagasta, the expelled workers had been contacted by the Chilean Army through the consul to serve in the Expeditionary Corps.

More than 1,000 Chileans remained imprisoned in Lima and Callao until the occupation of the capital of Peru by the Chilean forces in January 1881. Others became forced laborers in the coal mines of Junin, and at the end of 1879 and early 1880, there were still reports of persecution and suffering endured by those who were unable to leave Peru; on 19 November 1879, Spencer St John, British Plenipotentiary Minister in Peru, supported the claims of Henry Pender, a British subject who was beaten and robbed by the soldiers in Callao during riots against Chilean women married to foreign citizens. Pender had been mistaken for a Chilean.

Military consequences

According to Valentina Verbal Stockmeyer, the first troops of the Expeditionary Army of Chile came from the professional army originally fighting the Mapuche in Araucanía. The second wave of soldiers came from the Chilean inhabitants of Antofagasta which praised the Chilean occupation of the territory in February 1879. The next draft came from workers returning from Peru after their eviction. Chilean historian Francisco Antonio Encina estimated that about 7,000 repatriated people were enlisted in the Chilean Expeditionary Army.

Historians point out the Chilean soldiers' resentment towards their expulsion led to unlawful behavior during the war. Regarding the looting and burning of Mollendo, Gonzalo Bulnes wrote:

The Peruvian Navy dismissed Chileans who were serving in the warships before the eviction decree.

Aftermath

During the failed Peace Conference of Arica in 1880 and the negotiations of the Treaty of Ancon, one of the Chilean demands was the immediate return of confiscated property back to the expelled Chileans. Tribunales arbitrales (courts of arbitration) were established between Chile and Peru in order to determine the amount of reparations that was needed to be paid for the confiscated property. (see Chilean law 1014, Establecimiento de Tribunal Arbitral Chileno-Peruano en 1897).

Sergio Villalobos wrote about the expulsion:

See also 

 Chilenization of Tacna, Arica and Tarapaca, systematic discrimination and harassment against Peruvian citizens after the war in order to complete the annexation of the ceded territory of Tarapaca and to obtain the annexation of Tacna and Arica.

Notes and references

Notes

References

Bibliography

External links 

 Gilberto Harris Bucher, Tribulaciones de los emigrados chilenos en Perú, Bolivia y Argentina durante el siglo diecinueve, Universidad de Playa Ancha, Chile, Spanish language.

Forced migration
War of the Pacific
Refugees in South America
Chile–Peru relations
Bolivia–Chile relations
Chilean expatriates in Bolivia
Ethnic cleansing in the Americas
Anti-Chilean sentiment
History of Antofagasta Region
History of Tarapacá Region